Bakari Nondo Mwamnyeto (born 5 October 1995) is a Tanzanian professional footballer who plays as a centre-back for Tanzanian Premier League club Young Africans and the Tanzania national team.

Club career
Mwamnyeto began his senior career with Coastal Union in the Tanzanian Premier League, eventually becoming their captain. He transferred to Young Africans on 14 August 2020.

International career
Mwamnyeto made his senior debut with the Tanzania national team in a friendly 0–0 tie with Rwanda on 14 October 2019. He was part of the squad called up to the 2020 African Nations Championship.

References

External links
 
 

1995 births
Living people
Tanzanian footballers
Tanzania international footballers
Association football defenders
Young Africans S.C. players
Tanzania A' international footballers
2020 African Nations Championship players